Neoplecostomus doceensis is a species of catfish in the family Loricariidae. It is native to South America, where it occurs in the Doce River basin in the state of Minas Gerais in Brazil. It is typically found in small to medium-sized rivers with clear water, rocky outcrops, small waterfalls, and substrates composed of rocks and sand. The species reaches 10.1 cm (4 inches) in standard length.

References 

doceensis
Fish described in 2014
Catfish of South America
Fish of the Doce River basin